Bradley Moules is a former professional rugby league footballer who played as a  for the Wakefield Trinity (Wildcats) (Heritage № 1373) in the Super League.

References

External links
Wakefield Trinity profile

Living people
English rugby league players
Place of birth missing (living people)
Rugby league hookers
Wakefield Trinity players
Year of birth missing (living people)